The 1999 Nigerian House of Representatives elections in Katsina State was held on February 20, 1999, to elect members of the House of Representatives to represent Katsina State, Nigeria.

Overview

Summary

Results

Dutsin-Ma/Kurfi 
Party candidates registered with the Independent National Electoral Commission to contest in the election. PDP candidate Sabiu Hasan won the election.

Bindawa/Mani 
Party candidates registered with the Independent National Electoral Commission to contest in the election. PDP candidate Musa Aliyu won the election.

Rimi/Charanchi/Batagarawa 
Party candidates registered with the Independent National Electoral Commission to contest in the election. PDP candidate Muazu lemanu Tsegero won the election.

Musawa/Matazu 
Party candidates registered with the Independent National Electoral Commission to contest in the election. PDP candidate Abubakar G. Shehu won the election.

Mashi/Dutse 
Party candidates registered with the Independent National Electoral Commission to contest in the election. PDP candidate Abdu Haro Mashi won the election.

Baure/Zango 
Party candidates registered with the Independent National Electoral Commission to contest in the election. PDP candidate Shuaib Yahaya won the election.

Kaita/Jibia 
Party candidates registered with the Independent National Electoral Commission to contest in the election. PDP candidate Musa Nuhu A. won the election.

Daura/Sadanmu 
Party candidates registered with the Independent National Electoral Commission to contest in the election. PDP candidate Adamu Saidu won the election.

Kankia/Kusada/Ingawa 
Party candidates registered with the Independent National Electoral Commission to contest in the election. PDP candidate Usman Mani Nassarawa won the election.

Bakori/Danja 
Party candidates registered with the Independent National Electoral Commission to contest in the election. PDP candidate Tukur I. Nasabo won the election.

Malumfashi/Kafur 
Party candidates registered with the Independent National Electoral Commission to contest in the election. PDP candidate Aminu Bello M. won the election.

Funtua/Dandume 
Party candidates registered with the Independent National Electoral Commission to contest in the election. PDP candidate B. Lawal Ibrahim won the election.

Safana/Batsari/D/M 
Party candidates registered with the Independent National Electoral Commission to contest in the election. PDP candidate Aminu Yakubu won the election.

Kankara/Faskari/Sabuwa 
Party candidates registered with the Independent National Electoral Commission to contest in the election. PDP candidate Lawal Yusuf Y. won the election.

Katsina 
Party candidates registered with the Independent National Electoral Commission to contest in the election. PDP candidate Abubakar S. Yar’adua won the election.

References 

1999 elections in Nigeria
February 1999 events in Nigeria
Katsina State elections